This is a recap of the 1962 season for the Professional Bowlers Association (PBA) Tour.  It was the Tour's fourth season. Included in the season's 30 events was the third PBA National Championship (won by Carmen Salvino) and the first-ever PBA Tournament of Champions, which featured all 25 previous PBA Tour champions to date. It was won by Joe Joseph, who had qualified by capturing his first PBA title only four events earlier.

Tournament schedule

References

External links
1962 Season Schedule

Professional Bowlers Association seasons
1962 in bowling